Popstars – Just 4 Girls is the seventh season of Popstars, a German reality TV show, in which young aspiring female singers/dancers compete in order to claim a place in the next girl group. The contestants, who also live together during the course of the show, are groomed and judged by the choreographer Detlef D! Soost, and are judged on their vocal and dancing ability by rapper Sido and singer Loona. The grand prize for the four winners is a record deal with Warner Music Group as well as the opportunity to join The Pussycat Dolls on their next world tour. This is the format for the seventh season, focusing mostly on female dancers/singers, looking for fame in the music industry.

The show opened in August 2008. Leonore Bartsch, who failed to qualify for the finale of the 2006 season of Popstars, was the first band member to be announced on 20 November 2008. The finale was held one week before Christmas, concluding with the announcement of the fourth band member of the group Queensberry.

Elimination's call-out order 

 The contestant was eliminated
 The contestant was eliminated outside of the judging panel
 The contestant won the reward challenge
 The contestant won the reward challenge, but was eliminated
 The contestant quit the competition
 The contestant was band-leader and as such is safe from elimination
 The contestant was band-leader and as such is safe from elimination and won the reward challenge
 The contestants were safe from elimination and not called by their names
 The contestant won the competition

External links 
Official website
Official Facebook account
Official Warner Music label website
 

Just 4 Girls
2008 German television seasons